The World Changes is a 1933 American pre-Code drama film directed by Mervyn LeRoy and starring Paul Muni as an ambitious farm boy who becomes rich, but does not handle success well. Aline MacMahon and Mary Astor play his mother and wife respectively.

Plot summary

On the wagon trail in Dakota Territory 1856 (Indian territory)

A pregnant woman exits a wagon and digs her hands into soil. She and her husband decide to stop there to build a settlement cabin for a simple farm life. Orin, the father, plows fields while Anna, the Mother chops wood. Another wagon family is spotted. Orin Jr. is an infant. That family is also moving West (California) to live off land and raise a family in peace. Orin Sr. welcomes them to become neighbors. Anna muses that they will live there forever. Orin Sr speculates they will build a town with hundreds of families moving in. Orinville is established

1867

A Wedding celebration in town of Orinville.  Orin Sr. gives a speech and mentions that he hopes that Orin Jr. (now 11 years old) will one day marry his childhood friend, Selma. Colonel Custer (Clay Clement) arrives and announces, "The war is over." With surprise, Orin's mother proclaims, that no one in the town had any idea that the American Civil War had been raging for the past four years.

1877

Orin Jr. (Paul Muni) speaks with a Gambler, implied to be Buffalo Bill Cody (Douglass Dumbrille), about the money to be made driving steer from Texas northward, though Orin Sr. and Anna do not approve. Orin sneaks out of house in middle of the night. Leaving a letter that he is going to drive steer and that Selma will understand. On the cattle drive, he runs into trouble. River, Thunderstorms, and threats from bandits who shoot at and scare his cattle. But, Orin drives them into Omaha where Wild Bill Hickok is the sheriff and a business man, James Clafflin, who turned him down earlier is impressed. James talks Orin into driving the cattle into Chicago. He returns home to tell his parents and Selma. Orin Sr. asks why he can't stay in Orinville, but relents to son's wishes, because he believes that what drove him and Anna out West is the same thing that drives Orin Jr. to Chicago. Anna muses that she wishes it was, but sadly it is not. Orin asks Selma to leave with him, but she turns him down.

In Chicago, James Claffin's daughter Ginny (Mary Astor) is visiting after finishing school back East and meets Orin Jr. They marry in 1879. When her father dies in 1881, Ginny is distraught to see that everyone at the funeral is from the stockyard business, with no other friends or family present. Other Cattle Businessmen are complaining that Orin Nordholm is too ruthless of a businessman as he is always experimenting and making money every way possible. They pressure Orin Jr.'s lender not to renew his note. Orin Jr. tells the bank to invest in the invention rather than renew note. Nordholm Co is working on invention to move frozen beef. Rather than having to always transport live cattle. Orin Jr. spent all his money into trying to make the invention. In a throwaway line, Fred - the secretary says, "If only we could put ice boxes on wheels." Orin later has an epiphany, repeating the phrase "ice boxes on wheels".

1893

Nordhold now lives in a palatial estate with Ginny and their children. At dinner, Orin Jr. is upset that his mother sent a letter that she will not visit. He laments that his mother lives all alone on a farm in South Dakota. Orin and Ginny get into fight. First about his mother, but subsequently make up, only to then get into fight about their children visiting stockyards. Ginny has a breakdown about meat and the stock yards. A distraught Orin chases after Ginny who locks herself in their bedroom, before spotting his sons exchanging money with their butler.

1904

Ginny is excited the Randolph Clintons from New York will be visiting (one of the oldest families from the East). Orin Jr. is ornery that they are trying to take his company away. He also does not want to spend money on a lavish party. Richard and John are now grown, and Ginny wants Richard to marry Jennifer Clinton. John speaks with English accent after attending Oxford and begs everyone for money. Ginny makes huge announcement at party. She claims her husband Orin Nordholm is retiring and establishing an art gallery. Businessmen begin dumping shares in Nordholm and Co. Chicago. An upset Orin Rages against Wall Street and wants the family to stay in Chicago in a speech akin to his mother's. Virginia goes unconscious. Orin is informed that Ginny is in cerebral shock. He does not take news well. He wants to take care of her, but there is a run on Nordholm's company at Chicago Board of trade and Wall Street.  Shares are rapidly dropping. $68 -> $28 -> $17. Employees of Nordholm Co come through. They turn in their savings and mortgage their homes to help save company. Orin Jr. screams they will not sell out, and buys 100,000 shares at $100 right before 3:00 PM when exchange closes. When Orin returns home, he attempts to check on and calm Ginny. She has a psychotic break, screaming "Butcher, blood on your clothes", and then collapses. She dies, and Richard and John blame Orin for her death. Orin says he will sell the company.

1920s

An Older Nordholm reads a newspaper in wealthy club that his grand daughter will marry an English Nobleman (Sir Philip Ivor). He is extremely upset as is his Grandson, Orin Nordholm III. Jennifer Clinton says that he is like his grandfather. Richard Nordholm is a banker on Wall st. Banker in New York City. John reveals that Richard's Wall St banker success is all because Orin completely funded it. Sir Philip Ivor visits Orin Jr, only to be thrown out. Orin Jr. tells Richard that he is making a huge mistake letting Natalie marry Philip Ivor. Jennifer Clinton yells at him to get out of Richard's house. Richard does nothing. Orin Jr.'s mother is with a young woman named Selma who could have been his grand daughter. Orin III brings a letter that Orin Jr.'s (Paul Muni) mother is going to visit NYC. She is almost 90. He is very excited because he has never met his great grandmother, but Orin Jr. does not want his mother to know about his family troubles. Orin Jr., Orin III, and Anna have nice taxi ride, but extreme awkwardness and family fighting ensue when Anna finds out that nearly the entire family lives on Orin Jr.'s money.

10/23/1929 - 10/24/1929

Richard and his son Paul Nordholm are having a breakdown as stock market crashes and they are facing prison time. Orin Jr. will not bail them out and rails against bankers once again. He is happy to see Orin III and the young Selma. He bequeaths all his money and assets to his grandson, Orin III, so that he may start a new life in South Dakota with young Selma. His grandson, Paul, leaves a letter that he is running away to avoid prison time. Richard finds out his wife, Jennifer Clinton, has been having an affair for several years with Ogden who stole money. He proceeds to commit suicide in front of her. John gets drunk at wedding, because Richard's trust has gone bankrupt. He tells Sir Philip Ivor
who then stands up Natalie Nordholm at wedding, because her family is no longer wealthy. Orin Jr sees the body of Richard and gets flash backs of Ginny. Dismayed, Orin Jr. collapses down the stairs, presumably from a heart attack brought on by stress, and dies. Orin III and Young Selma return to Orinville with Anna, his Great Grandmother, to start a new life.

Cast
 Paul Muni as Orin Nordholm Jr.
 Aline MacMahon as Anna Nordholm
 Mary Astor as Virginia Clafflin Nordholm
 Donald Cook as Richard Nordholm
 Jean Muir as Selma Peterson II
 Mickey Rooney as Otto Peterson as a Child
 Guy Kibbee as James Clafflin
 Patricia Ellis as Natalie Clinton Nordholm
 Theodore Newton as Paul Nordholm
 Margaret Lindsay as Jennifer Clinton Nordholm
 Gordon Westcott as John Nordholm
 Alan Dinehart as Ogden Jarrett
 William Janney as Orin Nordholm III
 Charles Middleton as Wild Bill Hickok
 George Chandler as Piano Player 
 Henry O'Neill as Orin Nordholm

Box Office
According to Warner Bros records the film earned $376,000 domestically and $305,000 internationally.

References

External links
 
 
 
 

1933 films
1933 drama films
Films set in 1856
Films set in 1867
Films set in 1877
Films set in 1879
Films set in 1881
Films set in 1893
Films set in 1904
Films set in 1929
American business films
American drama films
American black-and-white films
1930s English-language films
Films directed by Mervyn LeRoy
First National Pictures films
1930s business films
Films produced by Robert Lord (screenwriter)
Warner Bros. films
1930s American films
Films scored by Bernhard Kaun
Cultural depictions of Buffalo Bill
Films about adultery in the United States